1922 in Argentine football saw Huracán win its second consecutive championship, while Independiente obtained its first title, the Asociación Amateurs de Football championship.

Primera División

Asociación Argentina de Football - Copa Campeonato
Alvear, Boca Alumni, San Fernando and Progresista made their debuts at the top division of Argentine football.

Asociación Amateurs de Football

Lower divisions

Primera B
AFA Champion: Boca Juniors II
AAm Champion: Argentino del Sud

Primera C
AFA Champion: Central Argentino
AAm Champion: Nacional FC

Domestic cups

Copa C. Ibarguren
Champion: Huracán

Argentina national team
The national team contested 4 competitions in 1922, but could not win any of them.

Copa América
Argentina was eliminated at semifinals by Paraguay.

Copa Lipton
Argentina lost to Uruguay 1-0 at Montevideo.

Copa Newton
In Buenos Aires, Argentina and Uruguay drew 2-2 but Uruguay won the trophy as visiting team.

Roca Cup
Argentina lost to Brazil 2-1 at Sao Paulo.

References

 
Seasons in Argentine football
1922 in South American football
1922 in association football